Nicolson is a patronymic surname meaning "son of Nicholas".  There are alternate spellings. Notable people with the surname include:

 Adam Nicolson, British writer, son of Nigel Nicolson
 Adela Florence Nicolson, British poet writing as "Laurence Hope"
 Alexander Mclean Nicolson, US inventor (crystals, sound)
 Arthur Nicolson, 1st Baron Carnock, British diplomat and politician
 Benedict Nicolson,  British art historian and author, son of Harold Nicolson and Vita Sackville-West
 Dan Henry Nicolson, American botanist
 David Nicolson, 4th Baron Carnock,  British peer and solicitor.
 Eric James Brindley Nicolson, Royal Air Force officer
 Gerda Nicolson, Australian actress
 Harold Nicolson, (1886–1968) British diplomat, politician and writer, son of Arthur Nicolson
 James Nicolson (bishop) (died 1607), Moderator of the General Assembly of the Church of Scotland & Bishop of Dunkeld.
 John Nicolson (disambiguation), multiple people
 Marjorie Hope Nicolson (1894-1981), American literary scholar
 Mark Nicolson, American tenor and voice teacher
 Nigel Nicolson, British publisher, writer and politician, son of Harold Nicolson and Vita Sackville-West
 Phyllis Nicolson, mathematician
 William Nicolson, British bishop

See also 
Nicolson Institute, school on the Isle of Lewis
Clan Nicolson, Scottish clan
Clan MacNeacail, Scottish clan
Nicholson (disambiguation)
Nicol

English-language surnames
Patronymic surnames
Surnames from given names